Samuele Papi (born 20 May 1973) is an Italian former volleyball player, a member of Italy men's national volleyball team in 1993-2012, silver and bronze medalist of the Olympic Games, multiple winner of the European Championship and World Championship, silver medalist of the World Cup 2003, three-time CEV Champions League winner, double CEV Cup winner, four-time Challenge Cup winner, six-time Italian Champion.

Career
Papi won five Italian titles, three European Champions cups, and, with the Italian national team, two World Championships (1994 and 1998) and three European Championships.  He competed at four Summer Olympics, winning two silver medals and two bronze medals.

Individual awards
 2003 European Championship "Best Receiver"
 2004 FIVB Volleyball World League "Best Spiker"

Awards
 2000  Knight's Order of Merit of the Italian Republic
 2004  Officer's Order of Merit of the Italian Republic

See also
 Legends of Italian sport - Walk of Fame

References

External links
 Samuele Papi at the International Volleyball Federation
 
 
 
 

1973 births
Living people
Sportspeople from Ancona
Italian men's volleyball players
Volleyball players at the 1996 Summer Olympics
Volleyball players at the 2000 Summer Olympics
Volleyball players at the 2004 Summer Olympics
Medalists at the 2004 Summer Olympics
Volleyball players at the 2012 Summer Olympics
Medalists at the 2012 Summer Olympics
Olympic medalists in volleyball
Olympic volleyball players of Italy
Olympic silver medalists for Italy
Olympic bronze medalists for Italy
Italian Champions of men's volleyball
Medalists at the 2000 Summer Olympics
Medalists at the 1996 Summer Olympics